Brindo a La Vida, Al Bolero, A Ti is an album by the American musician Vikki Carr. It was nominated for a Grammy Award for Best Latin Pop Album. It produced a hit single in the song '"Dejame". The album was released in 1992 via the Sony label.

Tracks 
 Dejame
 Tuya Soy
 La Cita
 Te Vi
 Cafe De La Mañana
 Eclipse
 Di Como Te Dejo De Amar
 Una Mujer
 Yo Se Que Te Voy Amar
 Desesperadamente
 Si Tu No Estas
 Nadie
 Fuimos Iguales
 How Do I Stop Loving You

References

External links
Vikki Carr

1992 albums
Vikki Carr albums
Spanish-language albums